Rabbi Michoel Pressburger (Michael Pressburger) is a leading Austrian haredi rabbi who heads the historic Schiffschul synagogue in Vienna's second district where a sizable Haredi Jewish community once thrived in the years leading to the Holocaust. Today, the Schiffschul is a much smaller synagogue serving the local Orthodox Jewish community while also serving as a sanctuary to Jewish refugees from Iran who transit through Vienna.

Rabbi Michoel Pressburger was born in Vienna and has continued the line of succession to Bonyhád rabbis such as his grandfather, Rabbi Aaron Pressburger and his father, Rabbi Schmuel Pressburger. Aaron Pressburger was the chief Orthodox rabbi of Bonyhád until the start of the Holocaust and perished in Auschwitz in 1943. "Kehilat Bonyhád" is a reference to the Jewish tradition that originated in the Orthodox community of Bonyhád and its surrounding areas in the late 1700s.

Now in his fifties, Michoel Pressburger has been helping rescue and resettle Jewish refugee teenagers from Iran and elsewhere for almost 30 years. His contact with the post-revolution Islamic government of Iran as well as American and Austrian governments has put him in a unique position to help with this endeavor. Since the majority of the refugees go through Vienna before they receive asylum in the United States, Rabbi Pressburger and his synagogue have helped with their physical and spiritual well-being while they are in transit in Austria.

Since 1983, Pressburger has headed an international non-profit organization to help with the rescue and resettlement of Jewish refugees from Iran.

He has been credited with numerous daring missions to Iran and elsewhere in the Middle East and Europe with the aim of rescuing Iranian Jews who have been subjected to religious persecution. At least four of these rescued refugees were previously condemned to death by the Iranian government.

References

External links 
 Schiffschul, austriansynagogues.com
 Transit. The Iranians in Vienna. Photographs by Christine de Grancy, Exhibition at the Jewish Museum Vienna
 Rabbi Michoel Pressburger on Helping Jews of Iran (Video) Vienna, March 2012

20th-century births
Living people
Rabbis from Vienna
Austrian Haredi rabbis
Austrian activists
Austrian people of Hungarian-Jewish descent
Austria–Iran relations
Iran–Israel relations
People from Leopoldstadt
Year of birth missing (living people)